Umma saphirina is a species of damselfly in the family Calopterygidae. It is found in Cameroon, Central African Republic, the Republic of the Congo, the Democratic Republic of the Congo, Kenya, Nigeria, and Uganda. Its natural habitats are subtropical or tropical moist lowland forests and rivers.

References

Calopterygidae
Odonata of Africa
Insects described in 1916
Taxonomy articles created by Polbot